Al-Ulufi Stadium is a multi-use stadium in Al Hudaydah, Yemen.  It is currently used for football matches and serves as the home stadium of Al-Hilal.  The stadium holds 10,000 people.

Football venues in Yemen